The Interamnia World Cup can be considered as the handball Olympics. It is the largest international handball competition established and it is contested by men's and women's national teams from all over the world. It takes place every year during the first week of July in Teramo in Italy. It will reach the 42nd edition in July 2014.

Handball competitions in Italy
Teramo
Sport in Abruzzo
International handball competitions hosted by Italy